Bishop's Mitre could refer to:
 several types of headdress, notably : 
 a traditional, ceremonial head-dress of bishops and some other clergy in Christian Churches. See mitre.
 a variety of types of headdress worn by European Grenadiers from the 17th Century. 
 Bishop's Mitre, a mountain in Labrador, Canada
 the Bishop's Mitre, the shieldbug Aelia acuminata